In Greek mythology, Alcyone (Ancient Greek Ἁλκυόνη Αlkuónē, derived from alkyon αλκυων "kingfisher") was the name of the following personages.
 Alcyone, one of the Pleiades seven sisters.
Alcyone, daughter of Aeolus and wife of Ceyx.
 Alcyone, daughter of Sthenelus and Nicippe (Antibia or Archippe). She undoubtedly witnessed the results of the labors of Heracles, and she herself was indebted to the hero when he killed Homadus the Centaur, who had attempted to rape her.
 Cleopatra Alcyone, Meleager's wife.
 Alcyone, wife of King Chalcodon of Euboea and possible mother of Elephenor.
 Alcyone, a priestess at Argos for three generations before the Trojan War.
Alcyone, mother of Serus and Alazygus by Halirrhotius, son of Perieres.
 Alcyone, daughter of Sciron who was killed by her father.

Notes

References 

 Apollodorus, The Library with an English Translation by Sir James George Frazer, F.B.A., F.R.S. in 2 Volumes, Cambridge, MA, Harvard University Press; London, William Heinemann Ltd. 1921. ISBN 0-674-99135-4. Online version at the Perseus Digital Library. Greek text available from the same website.
Diodorus Siculus, The Library of History translated by Charles Henry Oldfather. Twelve volumes. Loeb Classical Library. Cambridge, Massachusetts: Harvard University Press; London: William Heinemann, Ltd. 1989. Vol. 3. Books 4.59–8. Online version at Bill Thayer's Web Site
 Diodorus Siculus, Bibliotheca Historica. Vol 1–2. Immanel Bekker. Ludwig Dindorf. Friedrich Vogel. in aedibus B. G. Teubneri. Leipzig. 1888–1890. Greek text available at the Perseus Digital Library.
Dionysus of Halicarnassus, Roman Antiquities. English translation by Earnest Cary in the Loeb Classical Library, 7 volumes. Harvard University Press, 1937–1950. Online version at Bill Thayer's Web Site
Dionysius of Halicarnassus, Antiquitatum Romanarum quae supersunt, Vol I-IV. . Karl Jacoby. In Aedibus B.G. Teubneri. Leipzig. 1885. Greek text available at the Perseus Digital Library.
 Gaius Julius Hyginus, Fabulae from The Myths of Hyginus translated and edited by Mary Grant. University of Kansas Publications in Humanistic Studies. Online version at the Topos Text Project.
 Hesiod, Catalogue of Women from Homeric Hymns, Epic Cycle, Homerica translated by Evelyn-White, H G. Loeb Classical Library Volume 57. London: William Heinemann, 1914. Online version at theio.com
Tzetzes, John, Book of Histories, Book II-IV translated by Gary Berkowitz from the original Greek of T. Kiessling's edition of 1826. Online version at theio.com

Greek mythological priestesses
Aeolides
Princesses in Greek mythology
Queens in Greek mythology
Euboean characters in Greek mythology
Mythology of Argos